Harpagodidae is an extinct family of fossil sea snails, marine gastropod mollusks.

Genera
Genera within the family Harpagodidae include:
 Harpagodes Gill, 1870 † 
 Phyllocheilus Gabb, 1868 †

References
Biolib

Prehistoric gastropods